This is a list of notable people from Peshawar, Pakistan.

Sports
 Riaz Afridi, cricketer
 Shahid Afridi, Pakistani cricketer
 Iftikhar Ahmed, cricketer 
 Umar Gul, cricketer
 Arshad Khan, cricketer
 Yasir Hameed, cricketer
 Aamir Atlas Khan, Pakistan squash player
 Hashim Khan, former British Open squash champion
 Jahangir Khan, former World No. 1 squash player
 Jansher Khan, former squash world champion
 Kabir Khan, cricketer
 Mohammad Rizwan, cricketer
 Qamar Zaman, squash player
 Wajahatullah Wasti, cricketer

Politicians
 Taimur Khan Jhagra, Currently Finance and Health Minister, and architect of the Universal Sehat Card programme
 Farhatullah Babar, Pakistan Peoples Party president and spokesman
 Bashir Ahmad Bilour, Member of Provincial Assembly, senior minister
 Samar Haroon Bilour, First female elected parliamentarian from Peshawar, MPA, widow of Haroon Bilour
 Abdur Rab Nishtar, leader in Pakistan Movement; first Governor of Punjab, Pakistan
 Bhim Sen Sachar, Indian politician

Military
 Yahya Khan, President and Commander in Chief and Pakistan Army

Writers
 Patras Bokhari, Urdu poet
 Ghulam Muhammad Qasir, Urdu poet
 Sahibzada Abdul Qayyum, founder of Islamia College and Legislative Council member

Actors and Singers
 Ismail Gulgee, artist
 Raj Kapoor, Indian actor
 Marina Khan, actress
 Dilip Kumar, Indian actor
 Prithviraj Kapoor, Indian film actor
 Trilok Kapoor, Indian actor
 Vinod Khanna, Indian actor
 Haroon Bacha, Pashto singer, musician, and composer
 Said Rahman Shino, Pashto comedian and actor
 Ismail Shahid, Pashto comedian and actor
 Ayman Udas, singer and songwriter
 Sajid Ghafoor, musician

Others
 Kundan Lal Jaggi, co-founder of the Moti Mahal restaurant
 F. C. Kohli, father of Indian IT Industry
 Kuku Kohli, Bollywood director
 Sania Nishtar, cardiologist and health policy expert
 Suhail Galadari, khaleejtimes
 Abdur Rehman Peshawri, member of the Young Turks, Turkish Ambassador to Afghanistan
 Muhammad Rehman, cardiovascular surgeon and founder Rehman Medical College
 Malik Saad, late CCPO of Peshawar
 Vasubandhu, founder of the Yogacara school of Buddhism
 Mohammed Yahya, educationist, Minister of Education N.W.F.P., 1946-1947
 Rahimullah Yusufzai, journalist

References

Peshawar
 
Peshawar-related lists